Songs from the Mirror is the third solo album by Scottish singer-songwriter Fish, released in 1993 as his final album for Polydor. It does not contain any original material; instead it is a cover album featuring Fish's versions of songs by artists who inspired him before his career started. It reached 46 on the UK Albums Chart.

Background
The album was influenced by David Bowie's 1973 covers project, Pin Ups. Fish included a version of his favourite Bowie song, "Five Years". He also recorded versions of songs by The Moody Blues, Alex Harvey, Pink Floyd, The Kinks, Argent, Sandy Denny, Genesis and T Rex. The songs all date from a period between 1970 and 1976 and reflect Fish's taste in music when he was 12 to 18 years old. The title is a reference to the time when he would impersonate his teenage idols in front of a mirror.

Polydor initially rejected the idea of a cover album, but eventually accepted it as the second album Fish was obliged to deliver under their contract. As of April 2016, Songs from the Mirror is Fish's last ever output on a major record company; however, he did record for Roadrunner Records in the late 90s, an indie label with major distribution later sold to a conglomerate.

Musicians
The core line-up on this album is the same as on the 1992 tour. Since the recording of Internal Exile, keyboardist Mickey Simmonds had been replaced with Foster Paterson, while drummer Kevin Wilkinson had taken over from session player Ethan Johns. The spots for guitars (Robin Boult, Frank Usher) and bass (David Paton) had remained unchanged.
Other than that and backing vocals, only two tracks ("Solo" and "Jeepster") feature an additional guest musician, Ben Molleson on violin and tin whistle. Fish tried to get David Bowie to play the saxophone solo on "Five Years", but he didn't manage to get hold of Bowie, and the saxophone solo was skipped.
The album was mixed and produced by James Cassidy, who Fish had met while recording guest vocals for Jeff Wayne's musical Spartacus. Cassidy would also produce and co-write Fish's next album Suits (1994).

Single release
Only a lead single was released from this album, with Argent's 1972 hit "Hold Your Head Up" as the A-Side.  This was actually marketed as an EP entitled Never Mind The Bullocks (featuring Hold Your Head Up) even though the 7" and CD single only contained two and three songs respectively. Also, these songs were to be found on the album, providing little incentive for fans to purchase the single. A second single with David Bowie's "Five Years" as the A-Side was in the pipeline, but never officially released; only a radio promo exists.

Cover art
Songs from the Mirror is the only regular Fish album not to be designed by Mark Wilkinson. Fish had deliberately decided to not use Wilkinson, as he didn't want to give the impression it was an album with original material. Instead, he chose "The Guddler" by Scottish painter Keith McIntyre as the cover. "The Guddler" had also been the working title of the project.

Tour
The album was followed by a tour, which was significantly longer than the previous tour promoting Internal Exile.  After the 1992 "Toile Tour" in club-sized venues, this tour saw Fish return to large-capacity halls. However, this was also the last time he regularly played such venues.
The stage design initially featured 'nets' which separated the band from Fish. Some found this somewhat egotistical while others saw that it allowed Fish to interact with the audience and heighten the sense of atmosphere. However, after morale began to fall in the band, Fish finally decided to get rid of the nets and resumed with his normal stage setup.
The double live album Sushi (1994) was recorded during this tour and features five Songs from the Mirror.

Re-releases
After Fish signed with Roadrunner Records in 1998, Songs from the Mirror was re-released on this label along with the other studio albums from his back catalogue. The re-issue featured a changed track-list: "Jeepster" was removed, two other cover versions were added, "The Seeker" by The Who and "Time and a Word" by Yes, which had previously been released on the compilation Outpatients '93. "Time and A Word" was also part of the compilation Yin (1995).

Charts

Track listing
"Question" (Justin Hayward) (The Moody Blues, from A Question of Balance, 1970) – 6:41
"Boston Tea Party" (Alex Harvey, Hugh McKenna, Zal Cleminson) (Sensational Alex Harvey Band, from SAHB Stories, 1976) – 4:22
"Fearless" (David Gilmour, Roger Waters) (Pink Floyd, from Meddle, 1971) – 6:15
"Apeman" (Ray Davies) (The Kinks, from Lola Versus Powerman and the Moneygoround, Part One, 1970) – 5:57
"Hold Your Head Up" (Rod Argent, Chris White) (Argent, from All Together Now, 1972) – 3:47
"Solo" (Denny) (Sandy Denny, from Like an Old Fashioned Waltz, 1974) – 4:46
"I Know What I Like" (Tony Banks, Phil Collins, Peter Gabriel, Steve Hackett, Mike Rutherford) (Genesis, from Selling England by the Pound, 1973) – 4:17
"Jeepster" (Marc Bolan) (T. Rex, from Electric Warrior, 1971) not included on 1998 remastered edition – 4:10
"Five Years" (David Bowie) (David Bowie, from The Rise and Fall of Ziggy Stardust and the Spiders from Mars, 1972) – 5:19
Total time 44:53

1998 Remastered edition
"Question" (Justin Hayward) (The Moody Blues, from A Question of Balance, 1970) – 6:41
"Boston Tea Party" (Alex Harvey, Hugh McKenna, Zal Cleminson) (Sensational Alex Harvey Band, from SAHB Stories, 1976) – 4:22
"Fearless" (David Gilmour, Roger Waters) (Pink Floyd, from Meddle, 1971) – 6:15
"Apeman" (Ray Davies) (The Kinks, from Lola Versus Powerman and the Moneygoround, Part One, 1970) – 5:57
"Hold Your Head Up" (Rod Argent, Chris White) (Argent, from All Together Now, 1972) – 3:47
"I Know What I Like" (Tony Banks, Phil Collins, Peter Gabriel, Steve Hackett, Mike Rutherford) (Genesis, from Selling England by the Pound, 1973) – 4:17
"Solo" (Sandy Denny) (Sandy Denny, from Like an Old Fashioned Waltz, 1974) – 4:46
"Time and a Word" (Jon Anderson, David Foster) (Yes, from Time and a Word, 1970) bonus track – 4.24
"The Seeker" (Townshend) (The Who, from Meaty Beaty Big and Bouncy, 1971) bonus track – 3:16
"Five Years" (David Bowie) (David Bowie, from The Rise and Fall of Ziggy Stardust and the Spiders from Mars, 1972) – 5:19
Total time 48:16

2017 The Remasters edition
Disc One
"Question" (Justin Hayward) (The Moody Blues, from A Question of Balance, 1970) – 6:41
"Boston Tea Party" (Alex Harvey, Hugh McKenna, Zal Cleminson) (Sensational Alex Harvey Band, from SAHB Stories, 1976) – 4:22
"Fearless" (David Gilmour, Roger Waters) (Pink Floyd, from Meddle, 1971) – 6:16
"Apeman" (Ray Davies) (The Kinks, from Lola Versus Powerman and the Moneygoround, Part One, 1970) – 5:56
"Hold Your Head Up" (Rod Argent, Chris White) (Argent, from All Together Now, 1972) – 3:46
"I Know What I Like" (Tony Banks, Phil Collins, Peter Gabriel, Steve Hackett, Mike Rutherford) (Genesis, from Selling England by the Pound, 1973) – 4:17
"Solo" (Sandy Denny) (Sandy Denny, from Like an Old Fashioned Waltz, 1974) – 4:06
"Jeepster" (Marc Bolan) (T. Rex, from Electric Warrior, 1971) – 4:04
"Time and a Word" (Jon Anderson, David Foster) (Yes, from Time and a Word, 1970)  – 4:21
"The Seeker" (Pete Townshend) (The Who, from Meaty Beaty Big and Bouncy, 1971) – 3:15
"Five Years" (David Bowie) (David Bowie, from The Rise and Fall of Ziggy Stardust and the Spiders from Mars, 1972) – 5:22
"Caledonia" (Dougie MacLean) (Alan Roberts and Dougie MacLean, from Caledonia, 1978) bonus track – 4:20
Total time 56:39

Disc Two
"Something in the Air (Live Hamburg 1992)" (Speedy Keen) – 5:59
"I Know What I Like ('93 Demos)" – 3:16
"The Seeker ('93 Demos)" – 3:17
"Fearless (Live Utrecht 1993)" – 6:49
"Boston Tea Party (Live Utrecht 1993)" – 4:13
"Jeepster (Live Utrecht 1993)" – 3:54
"Hold Your Head Up (Live Utrecht 1993)" – 3:08
"Five Years (Live Utrecht 1993)" – 7:58
"Roadhouse Blues (Live Acoustic Duisberg 1994)" (Jim Morrison, Robbie Krieger, Ray Manzarek, John Densmore) (The Doors, from Morrison Hotel, 1970) – 7:30
"Jeepster (Live Acoustic Duisberg 1994)" – 5:35
"Solo (Live Acoustic Krakow 1995)" – 5:19
"Boston Tea Party (with SAHB 1995)" – 4:57
"Faith Healer (Live NEARFest USA 2008)" (Alex Harvey, Hugh McKenna) (Sensational Alex Harvey Band, from Next, 1973) – 6:24
Total time 67:47

Disc Three: DVD
"Reflections - A look back at ‘Songs from the Mirror’. A film by David Barras and Scott MacKay" – 1:29:08
"Fearless" – 7:10
"Boston Tea Party" – 4:12
"Jeepster / Hold Your Head Up" – 4:04
"Five Years" – 7:48
"Hold Your Head Up" (video) – 3:31
"Solo (Cropredy Festival, 2005)" – 6:38

Personnel
From original release liner notes:
 Derek W. Dick (Fish) – vocals
 Robin Boult – guitar, background vocals
 Frank Usher – guitar
 Foster Paterson – keyboards, background vocals
 David Paton – bass guitar, background vocals
 Kevin Wilkinson – drums, percussion
 Danny Campbell – backing vocals ("Boston Tea Party", "Fearless", "Apeman", "Hold Your Head Up", "Solo", "I Know What I Like", "Five Years")
 Lorna Bannon – backing vocals  ("Fearless", "Hold Your Head Up", "Solo", "I Know What I Like", "Five Years")
 Jackie Bird – backing vocals ("Fearless", "Solo", "Five Years")
 The "Harmony" Choir – additional backing vocals ("Five Years")
 Ben Molleson – fiddle, whistle ("Solo", "Jeepster")
 Gaëtan Shurrer – additional programming ("Question", "Boston Tea Party", "Apeman", "I Know What I Like", "Jeepster")
 Steve Howe – guitar ("Time and a Word")
 Zal Cleminson – guitar ("Caledonia")
 Brian Robertson – guitar ("Caledonia")
 Hugh McKenna – keyboards ("Caledonia")
 Ted McKenna – drums ("Caledonia")
 Mary Kiani – backing vocals ("Caledonia")
 David Bogie – lawnmower
 Caroline Boult – party invitation
 Mick Wall – answering machine
 Haddington Bear – Zippo
 Mr Samples – Native Americans
 Glasgow Barrowland Company Ensemble – "Geezabun" Choir

References

External links
 
 

1993 albums
Fish (singer) albums
Covers albums
Polydor Records albums